Archangelo Piccolomini or Arcangelo Piccolomini (1525–1586) was an Italian anatomist and personal physician to a number of popes.

He was born in Siena in 1525, and moved to Ferrara. He completed his studies in the field of medicine and philosophy there. He went to France in 1550 where he was appointed Chair of Philosophy at the Academy of Bordeaux, and compiled a broad commentary on the treatise of Galeno De Humoribus in 1556, dedicating it to the Bishop of Ceneda, Michele Della Torre and apostolic nuncio to Paris.

He was called to Rome by Pope Paul IV in 1557, and became the personal physician to the pope. A position he maintained under successive popes Pius IV and Gregory XIII. From 1575 he taught anatomy at the Sapienza.

In 1586 he published the anatomical treatise Anatomicae praelectiones explicantes mirificam corporis humani fabricam, which he dedicated to Pope Sixtus V, who had just taken office. He was the first to describe and differentiate the white matter of the cerebrum from the grey matter of the cortex. His observations led to the anatomical study of the cortex by Marcello Malphigi and Antonie van Leeuwenhoek.

He died later that year in Rome, and was buried in the church of Santa Maria della Minerva.

References

1525 births
1586 deaths
Italian anatomists
Physicians from Rome
16th-century Italian physicians